Zovashen or Zovachen may refer to:
Zovashen (Dzhannatlu), Ararat, Armenia
Zovashen (Keshishveran), Ararat, Armenia
Zovashen, Kotayk, Armenia